The 4th parallel north is a circle of latitude that is 4 degrees north of the Earth's equatorial plane. It crosses the Atlantic Ocean, Africa, the Indian Ocean, Southeast Asia, the Pacific Ocean and South America.

Around the world
Starting at the Prime Meridian and heading eastwards, the parallel 4° north passes through:

{| class="wikitable plainrowheaders"
! scope="col" | Co-ordinates
! scope="col" | Country, territory or sea
! scope="col" | Notes
|-valign="top"
| style="background:#b0e0e6;" | 
! scope="row" style="background:#b0e0e6;" | Atlantic Ocean
| style="background:#b0e0e6;" | Gulf of Guinea - passing just north of Bioko island, 
|-
| 
! scope="row" | 
| Passing just south of Douala
|-
| 
! scope="row" | 
|
|-
| 
! scope="row" | 
|
|-
| 
! scope="row" | 
|
|-
| 
! scope="row" | 
|
|-
| 
! scope="row" | 
| Passing through Lake Turkana
|-
| 
! scope="row" | 
|
|-
| 
! scope="row" | 
|
|-
| 
! scope="row" | 
|
|-
| 
! scope="row" | 
|
|-
| style="background:#b0e0e6;" | 
! scope="row" style="background:#b0e0e6;" | Indian Ocean
| style="background:#b0e0e6;" |
|-
| 
! scope="row" | 
| Ari Atoll
|-
| style="background:#b0e0e6;" | 
! scope="row" style="background:#b0e0e6;" | Indian Ocean
| style="background:#b0e0e6;" |
|-
| 
! scope="row" | 
| Malé Atoll
|-
| style="background:#b0e0e6;" | 
! scope="row" style="background:#b0e0e6;" | Indian Ocean
| style="background:#b0e0e6;" |
|-
| 
! scope="row" | 
| Island of Sumatra
|-
| style="background:#b0e0e6;" | 
! scope="row" style="background:#b0e0e6;" | Strait of Malacca
| style="background:#b0e0e6;" |
|-
| 
! scope="row" | 
| Perak, Pahang, Terengganu and Pahang again, on Peninsular Malaysia
|-
| style="background:#b0e0e6;" | 
! scope="row" style="background:#b0e0e6;" | South China Sea
| style="background:#b0e0e6;" |
|-
| 
! scope="row" | 
| Island of Natuna Besar
|-
| style="background:#b0e0e6;" | 
! scope="row" ! scope="row" style="background:#b0e0e6;" | South China Sea
| style="background:#b0e0e6;" |
|-
| 
! scope="row" | 
| Sarawak, island of Borneo
|-
| 
! scope="row" | 
| North Kalimantan, islands of Borneo and Nunukan
|-
| style="background:#b0e0e6;" | 
! scope="row" style="background:#b0e0e6;" | Celebes Sea
| style="background:#b0e0e6;" |
|-
| 
! scope="row" | 
| Talaud Islands
|-valign="top"
| style="background:#b0e0e6;" | 
! scope="row" style="background:#b0e0e6;" | Pacific Ocean
| style="background:#b0e0e6;" | Passing just south of Merir island,  Passing just north of Nukuoro atoll,  Passing just north of Tabuaeran atoll,  Passing just north of Malpelo island, 
|-
| 
! scope="row" | 
|
|-
| 
! scope="row" | 
|
|-
| 
! scope="row" | 
| Roraima
|-
| 
! scope="row" | 
|
|-
| 
! scope="row" | 
| Roraima
|-
| 
! scope="row" | Disputed area
|-
| 
! scope="row" | 
|
|-
| 
! scope="row" | 
|
|-
| 
! scope="row" | 
| French Guiana
|-
| 
! scope="row" | 
| Amapá
|-
| style="background:#b0e0e6;" | 
! scope="row" style="background:#b0e0e6;" | Atlantic Ocean
| style="background:#b0e0e6;" | Passing just south of Cape Palmas, 
|-
|}

See also
3rd parallel north
5th parallel north

n04